Tall Seyyed Fakhr Ahmad (also Romanized as Tall Seyyed Fakhr Aḩmad; also known as Seyyed Fakhr Aḩmad) is a village in Sepidar Rural District, in the Central District of Boyer-Ahmad County, Kohgiluyeh and Boyer-Ahmad Province, Iran. At the 2006 census, its population was 169, in 28 families.

References 

Populated places in Boyer-Ahmad County